The governor of New Hampshire has a term of two years; the officeholder can seek reelection. The original title was president of New Hampshire. It was changed to "governor" during the term of Josiah Bartlett, though the office itself remained the same.

The longest-serving governor in state history is Federalist John Taylor Gilman, who served as governor for 14 years (albeit nonconsecutive), from 1794 to 1805 and from 1813 to 1816.

List of governors and presidents
The last of the colonial governors of New Hampshire fled in 1775.

 Parties

Succession

Notes

See also
 List of colonial governors of New Hampshire
 New Hampshire
 Province of New Hampshire

Lists of state governors of the United States
Governors
Governors